Yihai Cao, M.D., hM. D., Ph.D., (born October 29, 1959) is a Chinese-born Swedish scientist and a professor at the Karolinska Institute, Sweden. He is also an honorary professor/guest professor in Copenhagen University, Denmark; Linköping University, Sweden; Leicester University, UK; Shinshu University, Japan; Shandong University, China; and Peking University, China. He is an internationally recognized and cited researcher in cancer, obesity, diabetes, cardiovascular disease, and eye disease research. His publications have been cited more than 35000 times and his h-index is 92. Cao received the Fernström research prize, the Karolinska distinguished professor award, and the Axel Hirsch Prize in medicine. Cao received an ERC-advanced research grant award, and a Novo Nordisk-advanced grant award. From 2018, Cao was elected to Academia Europaea, the European Academy of Sciences and Arts, the Chinese Academy of Engineering, the National Academy of Inventors, and The World Academy of Sciences. His research findings received broad public attentions including New York Times, Reuters and Swedish National TV broad casting.

Contributions to medicine 
Cao participated in the discovery of angiostatin, an endogenous angiogenesis inhibitor, in Judah Folkman ́s Laboratory. He discovered several angiostatic proteins for potential treatment of cancer. Cao's laboratory discovered catechins in green tea as oral angiogenesis inhibitors. They also discovered several lymphangiogenic factors that potentially contribute to cancer metastasis. Cao proposed a new concept of off-tumor targets of antiangiogenic drugs as potential clinical benefits by improving systemic disease in cancer patients. Together with Henrich Cheng and Lars Olson, Cao for the first time shows that spinal cord can be regenerated by FGF-1. Cao's laboratory was one of the first proposing the concept of combination therapy comprising angiogenic and arteriogenic factors for treatment of ischemic muscle disease. They were one of the first who proposed targeting adipose angiogenesis for treatment of obesity and metabolic diseases.

Founder of companies 
Cao founded Swenora in 2001. The company develops new therapeutics for treatment of spinal cord injury. In 2005 he founded Clanotech (2005–present), which develops novel antiangiogenic drugs for treatment of ocular disease and fibrosis disease.

References 

1959 births
Living people
Chinese emigrants to Sweden
Karolinska Institute alumni
Academic staff of the Karolinska Institute
People from Jinan
Scientists from Shandong
Shandong University alumni
Swedish medical researchers
Educators from Shandong
Foreign members of the Chinese Academy of Engineering
TWAS fellows
Members of Academia Europaea
Members of the European Academy of Sciences and Arts